Gori (Goris municiṗaliṫeṫi) is a district of Georgia, in the region of  Shida Kartli. After abolishment of former South Ossetian Autonomous Oblast, the Gori District included the territory of former Tskhinvali District.  Some northern territories of the district are part of a self-proclaimed republic of South Ossetia and have not been under control of the Georgian government since 1992. It is bordered by the municipalities of Kaspi to the east, Borjomi and Tsalka to the south, and Kareli to the west. The area of Gori municipality is 1352 km2 and the population is 125,692 people. The administrative center of the municipality is the city of Gori.

Politics
Gori Municipal Assembly (Georgian: გორის საკრებულო) is a representative body in Gori Municipality. currently consisting of 36 members. The council is assembles into session regularly, to consider subject matters such as code changes, utilities, taxes, city budget, oversight of city government and more. Gori sakrebulo is elected every four year. The last election was held in October 2021.

Administrative divisions 

Gori municipality (those parts under de facto Georgian jurisdiction) is divided into 1 city (ქალაქი), 23 communities (თემი), and 115 villages (სოფელი).

Cities 
 Gori
 Tskhinvali

Communities 
 Ateni
 Akhalubani
 Berbuki
 Boshuri
 Dici
 Variani
 Zeghduleti
 Karaleti
 Mereti
 Mejvriskhevi
 Mghebriani
 Nikozi
 Saqavre
 Skra
 Tiniskhidi
 Tirdznisi
 Tqviavi
 Kvakhvreli
 Shavshvebi
 Shindisi
 Dzevera
 Khidistavi

Villages 
 Ateni
 Tsedisi
 Bnavisi
 Olozi
 Ghvarebi
 Akhalubani
 Kveshi
 Akhrisi
 Adzvi
 Mumlaant Kari
 Jariasheni
 Tsitsagiaant Kari
 Kvemo Artsevi
 Berbuki

See also 
 List of municipalities in Georgia (country)

References

External links 
 Official website of Gori District (Georgian, English)
 Districts of Georgia, Statoids.com

Municipalities of Shida Kartli